Gustine High School is a public primary, intermediate, and high school located in Gustine, Texas (USA) and classified as a 1A school by the UIL. It is part of the Gustine Independent School District located in central Comanche County. In 2015, the school was rated "Met Standard" by the Texas Education Agency.

Athletics
The Gustine Tigers compete in the following sports:

 Basketball
 Cross Country
 Six Man Football
 Golf
 Powerlifting
 Tennis
 Track & Field
 Volleyball

References

External links
Gustine ISD

Public high schools in Texas
Education in Comanche County, Texas